A coin capsule or "slab" is a type of plastic capsule designed to prevent coins from becoming damaged by protecting it from outside contaminants, scratches and drops while allowing the coin to be viewed through transparent plastic. Coin capsules are commonly used by coin collectors, numismatists or coin grading services to store and keep coins safe. The varied nature of coin sizes has led to a wide range of differently sized capsules becoming available each offer different levels or protection or security. Some types of capsules are designed with the ability to be reopened while others, once closed cannot be reopened without damaging the capsule.
Now coin capsules are coming with adjustable foams inside it so that coin doesn't move after insertion in capsules. Starting from 20mm, it can vary in size like 31mm, 35mm, 44mm and 50mm.

References

Coin grading
Numismatics
Coin collecting